Colin Campbell (July 12, 1931 – January 17, 2012) was a Roman Catholic bishop of the Roman Catholic Diocese of Antigonish, Nova Scotia, Canada.

On 26 May 1956 he was ordained a priest in Halifax and he was appointed bishop of the Diocese of Antigonish on 12 December 1986. He was ordained as a bishop the following year on 19 March 1987, and consecrated by bishops James Martin Hayes, Donat Chiasson, and William Edward Power.

Later years and death
Bishop Campbell resigned on 26 October 2002, and died on January 17, 2012, aged 80, from undisclosed causes.

External links
 Profile of Bishop Campbell at Catholic Hierarchy website 
 Notice of Bishop Campbell's death

20th-century Roman Catholic bishops in Canada
1931 births
2012 deaths
People from Halifax, Nova Scotia
21st-century Roman Catholic bishops in Canada